Guruvalapparkovil is a village in the Udayarpalayam taluk of Ariyalur district, Tamil Nadu, India.

Demographics 

As per the 2001 census, Guruvalapparkovil had a total population of 6098 with 3078 males and 3020 females.

References 

Villages in Ariyalur district